"Everyday" is a song written by Buddy Holly and Norman Petty, recorded by Buddy Holly and the Crickets on May 29, 1957, and released on September 20, 1957, as the B-side of "Peggy Sue", which went to three on the Billboard Top 100 chart in 1957. The song is ranked number 238 on Rolling Stone magazine's list of the "500 Greatest Songs of All Time".

On the original single the Crickets are not mentioned, but it is known that Holly plays acoustic guitar; drummer Jerry Allison slaps his knees for percussion; Joe B. Mauldin plays a standup acoustic bass; A celesta, which is a keyboard instrument with a glockenspiel-like tone, is also used in the recording.

Personnel
The Crickets
 Buddy Holly - vocals, guitar
 Joe B. Mauldin - bass
 Jerry Allison - drums

Additional personnel
 Vi Petty - celesta

Cover versions

Tina Robin recorded a version of the song, also for Coral Records, in 1958.

In 1960, Bobby Vee released a version as the B-side of his hit song "Rubber Ball".

John Denver recorded this song for his 1971 album Aerie and released it as a single, which peaked at number 81 on the Billboard pop singles chart and number 21 on the Adult Contemporary chart in 1972.

Bridget St. John recorded this song for her 1972 album Thank You For..., published by Dandelion and marketed by Polydor. Produced by Bridget St. John and Jerry Boys.

Don McLean recorded this song for his 1973 album Playin' Favorites and released it as a single, which peaked at number 38 in the UK.

The English teen pop singer Nikki Richards recorded the song as the B-side of his first single in 1978.

A version recorded by James Taylor was released in 1985, rising to number 3 on the Billboard Adult Contemporary chart in the US and number 1 on the Canadian Adult Contemporary chart; it also reached number 61 on the Billboard Pop chart and number 26 on the Billboard Country chart. The song is included on his 1985 album "That's Why I'm Here" and his two-CD career retrospective, The Essential James Taylor, released in 2013.  Cash Box called Taylor's version "a perfect showcase for Taylor’s mellow-rocking delivery" with "nice melodic changes and a touching sentiment."  Billboard said it has "the wit and style he applied to 'Handy Man."

Erasure recorded it for their 2002 album Other People's Songs. The Trashmen and the indie rock band Rogue Wave also recorded it. The rock band Pearl Jam performed a rendition live in Lubbock, Texas, Holly's birthplace. It has also been performed live by Deep Purple. A version was recorded by hellogoodbye and released on their 2008 EP, Ukulele recordings. Phil Ochs used a portion of the song as part of his "Buddy Holly Medley", which was included on his album Gunfight at Carnegie Hall in 1974.

Elliott Murphy recorded this song for a French tribute, Every Day Is a Holly Day, in 1989.

In 1990, the British guitarist Peter White recorded it for the album Reveillez-Vous.

Pearl Jam covered the song in Lubbock, Texas, on October 18, 2000. 

Rogue Wave recorded a cover version for the covers compilation soundtrack released in support of video game Stubbs the Zombie in 2005.

Fiona Apple recorded a cover version for the Buddy Holly tribute album Rave On Buddy Holly in 2011.

Patrick Stump contributed a cover version to the Buddy Holly tribute album Listen to Me: Buddy Holly in 2011.

The song is also on the 2012 Japanese CD Levi Dexter & Gretsch Brothers, featuring Rockabilly Hall of Fame inductee Levi Dexter.

Title
The song's title is spelled everyday, which is an adjective (meaning commonplace, ordinary, or normal), whereas in the context of the song the adverbial phrase every day (meaning each day) is clearly intended: "Every day seems a little longer / Every day it's a-gettin' closer."

In film and television
The song was used in the 1985 comedy Mischief, the 1986 film Stand by Me, the 2003 fantasy drama Big Fish, the 2009 romantic film Love Happens, the 2011 thriller drama We Need to Talk About Kevin, the 2009 science fiction film Mr. Nobody, and in the 1997 art film Gummo.

The song is played in a 2009 episode of Family Guy during a parody of Stand by Me.

The 2010 AT&T/Blackberry Torch commercial used "Everyday".

The song is played at the beginning of the eleventh episode of the fourth season of Lost ("Cabin Fever"), as well as during the closing credits of the penultimate episode of Mad Men ("The Milk and Honey Route").

The song is played in the sixth episode of the third season of Hulu's The Handmaid's Tale. It was also used in season three of Hulu's Future Man.

The song is covered in the end credits of the seventh episode of the second season of HBO's Crashing, sung by Fiona Apple.

The song is also sung in Party of Five (season 1, episode 7) by the character Julia, played by actress Neve Campbell.

The song is featured in the NBC show Lincoln Rhyme: Hunt for the Bone Collector.

The song is used as the opening song for Ryan Reynolds’ and Rob McElhenney’s docuseries Welcome to Wrexham from episode 3 onwards.

References

1957 singles
1972 singles
1985 singles
Buddy Holly songs
Bobby Vee songs
James Taylor songs
Songs written by Buddy Holly
Songs written by Norman Petty
John Denver songs
1957 songs
Song recordings produced by Norman Petty
Coral Records singles
RCA Records singles
Columbia Records singles